The Homestead Caldera, known locally as "The Crater" is a natural geothermal hot spring surrounded by a rock dome. It is located in Midway, Utah.

History

"The Crater" is estimated to be around 10,000 years old and is one of many geothermal hot pots in the Midway, Utah region. These geological features have attracted miners and workers passing through the area as a place of respite to get a little rest and relaxation. What was once a refuge from a life of hard work in the 20th century has now become an attraction for snorkelers and scuba divers due to the perpetually warm water.

Geology

The dome over the 90 degree water is 55 feet high and was created when the mineral-rich water deposited enough sediment over thousands of years to create the cathedral-like dome. Water pumps in through an aquifer with water heated by the earth's interior at a rate of 135,000 gallons per day, keeping the water clean and warm. The influx of water also created the mound of tufa or travertine that has been built up by the flow of the mineral rich water. Studies suggest that rain and snow melt in the nearby Wasatch Mountains percolated into the ground, descended along cracks and fractures to depths of one to two miles to get heated and then returned to the surface and depositing that material as travertine. Travertine is mainly composed of calcium and produces an abundance of white, porous lava-like rock that is very common in the Midway area. The Homestead Caldera is the largest mineral dome in the area and is approximately 55 feet high and 400 feet wide at its base. The water in the crater is about 65 feet deep and an 8–14 foot deep layer of silt covers the bottom of the crater. There is an ongoing archaeological project that works to retrieve items from the silt that have been lost or thrown down into the crater over hundreds of years. Artifacts retrieved include firearms and coins.

Water profile
The spring water emerges from the bedrock at 90°F.

Development of the site

It is now a commercial location open year-round to scuba divers and swimmers. Originally, it was accessed from a large natural opening at the top of the dome, but has since had a tunnel blasted through horizontally for easy access. Before the owners of The Homestead property decided to make the caldera more accessible, potential divers or mineral water soakers had to rappel through the hole at the top of the crater to access the water. In the 1990s a 110 foot tunnel was created on the north side of the rock formation. "The Crater" opened to the public on July 12, 1996 and features a wooden deck and two designated soaking areas. Dr. Jerry Simons spearheaded the tunnel project to make "The Crater" more accessible. He conducted ongoing archaeological research, further developed the site as a scuba destination for divers across the country.

Filming Location

"The Crater" was used in the Danny Boyle film 127 Hours as a shooting location. It was also featured in season 16 of the reality television show The Bachelor when bachelor  Ben Flajnik and his date Jennifer rappelled down from the hole in the top of the dome down to the water below.

Fatality
In 2011 a 26 year old man training for the U.S. National Freediving championship died during a six minute freedive. The family sued due to the fact there was no lifeguard on duty.

References

External links
Homestead Crater - Midway, Utah Geothermal Spring HD (youtube video)

Geology of Utah
Hot springs of Utah
Bodies of water of Wasatch County, Utah
Tourist attractions in Wasatch County, Utah
Underwater diving sites in the United States